The Cardinal Langley Roman Catholic High School is a Roman Catholic secondary school in Middleton, Greater Manchester, England, for ages 11–18.
The school is named for Thomas Langley, a 15th-century prelate who hailed from Middleton.

Location
Cardinal Langley school is on Rochdale Road (A664), around one mile from the end of the Middleton spur of the A627(M). Hopwood Hall College and Hopwood Clough Nature Reserve are nearby to the north-west.

History

Grammar school
It opened under the supervision of the De La Salle Brothers in September 1959 as a grammar school with the first two years, gradually increasing year by year. The second year students were drawn from existing grammar schools in the area.

In the second year of existence the building work had not been completed and hence students attended on a half day basis. It was administered by Lancashire Education Committee and by 1967 had 780 boys. In 1974, it was taken over by the Metropolitan Borough of Rochdale. Since then, the number of De La Salle brothers teaching at the school reduced and by the early 1990s all Lasallian brothers had left.

Comprehensive
It became a comprehensive in 1979.

Parish & School
 St John Fisher RC Primary School
 St Peter's RC Primary School
 St Thomas More R.C. Primary School
 St. Mary's RC Langley

Academic performance
An Ofsted inspection undertaken on 9 May 2017 judged the school to be "good", in all inspected areas, including the sixth form college.

It gets GCSE results slightly above average, but at A-level it performs better, receiving the best results in Rochdale LEA.

Notable former pupils

Cardinal Langley RC Grammar School
 Maartin Allcock (b 1957), musician
 Clint Boon (b 1959), Inspiral Carpets and DJ
 Brendan Coogan (b 1970), television presenter
 Martin Coogan (b 1961), singer-songwriter, DJ
 Steve Coogan (b 1965), actor and comedian
 Paul O'Brien CBE FRS (b 1954), Professor of Chemistry at the University of Manchester
 Kieran Prendiville (b 1947), television presenter, writer
 Pearce Quigley, actor
 John Richmond (b 1960), fashion designer

Cardinal Langley RC High School
 JP Cooper (b 1983) singer/songwriter
 Liam Fray (b 1985), musician The Courteeners
Matt Greenwood (b 1995), actor
 Jane Hazlegrove (b 1968), actress
 Suranne Jones (b 1978), actress
 Kavana (b 1977), pop artist
 Keri-Anne Payne (b 1987), swimmer and Olympic silver medalist
 Paul Scholes (b 1974), footballer

Notes

External links
 
 

Secondary schools in the Metropolitan Borough of Rochdale
Catholic secondary schools in the Diocese of Salford
Manchester
Educational institutions established in 1959
1959 establishments in England
Middleton, Greater Manchester
Voluntary aided schools in England